An active surface is a surface of a radio telescope that is under active computer control of its shape.

Large (more than  10 m in diameter or length) radio telescopes always bend during operation, due to their enormous weight and the fact that even the strongest materials are not perfectly stiff.  This bending, in the range of a few millimetres, does not affect low frequency operation much, but dramatically reduces the efficiency of the telescope at higher frequencies where the wavelengths are comparable to the distortion.  Typically, the efficiency of a telescope drops appreciably when the deviation from the desired shape is more than 1/10 of the considered wavelength.  An active surface uses numerous small actuators to move the surface panels with respect to the underlying frame, and thus maintain the correct shape.

An active surface can try to compensate for many different types of errors.  The first is gravity—this is simplest since previous measurements, or even a mathematical model, can be used to predict (and correct) any bending.  More difficult is correction for wind and thermal errors, since these require measuring and correcting in real time.

Some examples of active surfaces are:
Green Bank Telescope
Large Millimeter Telescope
Sardinia Radio Telescope
Noto Radio Observatory

References

.  Discusses many practical details of an active surface.

Radio astronomy
Astronomical imaging
Astronomical instruments